Friedrich Erhard Niedt (31 May 1674 – 1717) was a German jurist, music theorist, and composer.

Niedt was born in Jena, and enrolled at the University of Jena in 1694, where he is thought to have studied law.  Around 1700, he moved to Copenhagen, staying in Hamburg along the way.  He died in Copenhagen.

The first part of his Musical Guide might be a record of musical techniques similar to what Johann Sebastian Bach used.

Theoretical Works

The Musical Guide, 1700-1710 

Niedt's Musical Guide consists of three parts, each of which are concerned with figured bass.  In the first part, Niedt discusses the basics of figured bass, and gives the following definition:

Niedt's suggestion that figured bass is "the most complete foundation of music" might be misinterpreted if it is read out of context, for later in this same quote, he clarifies that by "complete" he simply means that the keyboard can play many notes at once, whereas other instruments are limited to one note at a time.

The second part of the Musical Guide describes how variation may be introduced in figured bass.  Many examples are presented that demonstrate how simple musical materials may be made more complex.  Niedt justifies devoting an entire part of his book to variation because, he says, "variety in things or ideas ... is to no creature so pleasing and delightful as to the senses and sensibilities of the human soul."  In addition to variation, the second part of the Musical Guide also contains a specialized dictionary that defines musical terms, as well as a descriptive list of the specifications of 63 important organs found in various places across northern Europe.

The third part of the Musical Guide is incomplete, since Niedt died before finishing it.  Nonetheless, a substantial portion of the third section was published, which begins by describing counterpoint, and later branches off into other traditionally serious areas of music, such as canon.  Niedt is consistently hostile towards what he perceives to be musically pretentious.  For example, he has this to say about the sometimes arcane concept of musical mode:

Regarding counterpoint, Niedt calls it the musical equivalent of "spelling," and suggests that counterpoint arises from the realization of figured bass.  Niedt insists that "mere counterpoint contains no beauty" and that one can "discern no complete meaning or context" from it.  As opposed to pedagogues who developed rules for composing counterpoint on its own terms (such as Johann Fux), Niedt attempts instead to extend his figured bass instruction to encompass the subject of counterpoint.

Music 
 6 Suites for Oboe and Basso Continuo

Writings 
 The Musical Guide:  First Part (Musicalische Handleitung) (1700, 1710)
 Guide to Variation:  The Musical Guide:  Second Part (Handleitung zur Variation) (Hamburg 1706, 1721)
 Musical Guide:  Third and Last Part (Musicalische Handleitung dritter und letzter Theil) (published by Johann Mattheson, 1717)
 Musicalisches ABC zum Nutzen der Lehr- und Lernenden (Hamburg, 1708)

Notes

References 

Niedt, Friederich Erhardt; Poulin, Pamela L. (Trans.); & Taylor, Irmgard C. (Trans.) (1989). The Musical Guide. Oxford: Clarendon Press. 

1674 births
1717 deaths
German Baroque composers
German music theorists
18th-century classical composers
German classical composers
German male classical composers
18th-century German composers
18th-century German male musicians